The Ford Cargo is a forward control (cab-over-engine) truck model manufactured by Ford since 1981.  Designed by Ford of Britain as the successor of the larger Ford Transcontinental, the Cargo entered the North American market as the intended successor of the long-running Ford C-Series.

Following the 1986 sale of the commercial vehicle division of Ford of Europe to Iveco, the Ford Cargo was sold in Europe as an Iveco Ford to 1991, when it was updated, becoming the Iveco Eurocargo.  Following the sale of the Ford heavy-truck lines in 1997, the Cargo continued under the Freightliner and Sterling brands through 2007.  

Originally produced by Ford UK at its Langley facility from 1981 to 1993, the Cargo was also produced by Ford Brasil (the source of US-market production from 1986-1990) from 1981 to 2019, with current production sourced from Ford Otosan in Turkey.

Model overview 

The 1981 Ford Cargo was styled by Patrick Le Quément, designer of the Ford Sierra and the later Renault Twingo.  The styling of the Cargo intentionally followed the family look of Ford of Europe's car range with the distinctive louvred black "Aeroflow" grille also used on the likes of the Escort III the Cortina 80, both of which Le Quement had worked on under the leadership of Uwe Bahnsen.  Another distinguishing feature of the original design was quarter windows that extend down nearly to floor level (also seen in the Volvo FL) for drivers in urban locations, the design was intended to better show pathways and blindspots while parking.

Ford Cargo (Europe)
With the demise of the Ford Transcontinental heavy truck range in 1983, British Ford introduced a range of heavyweight Cargo tractor units ranging from 28- to 38-tonnes gcw. The 38-tonners were powered by the Cummins L10 while those at 28- and 32-tonnes had Perkins, Cummins, or air-cooled Deutz diesels. The 7.49 tonne Cargos had Dorset and Dover fours or sixes, starting with a  unit in the 0809. The Dover six-cylinder engines were mounted at a slant in the Cargo.

In 1986, Ford sold its European truck operations to the Italian Iveco group and subsequent vehicles have been badged Iveco Ford. After the recession in the 1990s, Iveco rationalised its production operations, overlooked by Keith Stanley Jones (Production Engineering Manager). Its Langley plant closed in October 1997, bringing British Iveco/Ford truck production to an end.

The original lightweight Cargo was replaced in 1993 by the Iveco Eurocargo range, covering the 7.5-ton to 18-ton GVW range. It was originally only built in Ford's Langley (Slough) plant, from which about a third of the production was exported to continental Europe. Cargos were also exported to Turkey and to Australia, while panels were supplied to Brazil for local assembly (these Brazilian trucks were also exported to the United States).

Production has expanded since: the model is still made in Argentina (only the Cargo 1722 between 1999 and 2000) and Venezuelan (also known as the Ford Trader) Ford subsidiaries, Turkey's Ford Otosan, and India's Ashok Leyland (as the eComet and as the Stallion).

Ford Cargo (Americas) 
In late 1985, for the 1986 model year, Ford introduced the Cargo as part of its United States commercial truck range. Intended to replace the long-running C-Series cabover (largely unchanged since 1957) the Cargo was gradually phased in alongside its predecessor, slotted below the larger CL-9000 semitractor.  For the first time, a commercial Ford truck sold in the United States was assembled outside of Louisville, Kentucky, with production sourced from Brazil. For the 1991 model year, production was moved to the Kentucky Truck Plant in Louisville, Kentucky. Following the 1997 sale of the Ford heavy-truck line to Freightliner, production of the Cargo shifted to Freightliner, where it was marketed and sold under the Freightliner FC and Sterling SC brand names through 2007. The Freightliner & Sterling Cargo were made by Freightliner in Mt. Holly, North Carolina. The Freightliner & Sterling Cargo were discontinued after the 2007 model year. 

In 2006, the Ford LCF was introduced in North America as part of a joint venture with Navistar International.  While not a direct successor to the Ford Cargo (designed as a Class 5/6 vehicle; the Cargo was a Class 6/7 truck), the LCF was a low-COE similar in configuration to the  Isuzu N-Series, Chevrolet/GMC W-Series, and Mitsubishi Fuso Canter.  After a poor market response, the Ford LCF and its International CF/CityStar counterpart were withdrawn after 2009.

Motorsport 
Rod Chapman won the FIA European Truck Racing Championship in 1985 and 1987 using a modified Cargo, with Gérard Cuynet doing the same in 1988.

References

External links

 

Cargo
Cargo
Cab over vehicles
Iveco vehicles
Vehicles introduced in 1981